Churchill Methodist Church, in the village of Churchill, North Somerset, is a Grade II listed Methodist church on the Somerset Mendip Methodist Circuit. Designed by Foster & Wood, Bristol, of Perpendicular Gothic style, the church opened on 2May 1881. The schoolroom and coach house, of Elizabethan architecture, were erected before the new church, and opened on 1June 1879 (Whitsun). Sidney Hill, a wealthy local businessman and benefactor, erected the church and schoolroom as a memorial to his wife.

The Reverend Meg Slingo is the incumbent minister for Churchill. The Anglican and Methodist churches work together in many areas, particularly activities that involve children and initiatives in the parish schools. The schoolroom is now used as a hall and is run by a charity. The hall has a newly refitted kitchen and smaller rooms making it useful for community activities.

History
Methodists in Churchill would meet at a private home (society meetings), until the autumn of 1835, when the first chapel was opened. William Baker was a trustee of the chapel by the time the Churchill tithe map had been constructed in 1843. This chapel was demolished in 1880 so that Sidney Hill could erect a new Wesleyan church on adjacent land gifted by William Bobbett. The new church was designed by Foster and Wood of Bristol in Perpendicular Gothic style, and erected by William Veals, master builder of Bristol, at a cost of £3,300. Hill would engage the same firm of architects in 1897 to design the nearby clock tower.

The schoolroom and coach house, of Elizabethan architecture, were erected before the new church, and opened on Whitsun, . These buildings cost £1,300 to build and the schoolroom was later linked to the new church by a cloister. Hill also vested in trustees money to provide an income for the maintenance of the chapel and schoolroom. In 1898, Sidney Hill funded the addition of a porch that was designed by Foster and Wood and built by Henry Rose of Churchill.

In 1906, Sidney Hill gifted land at the back of the church for a burial ground extension. The ground was consecrated in June of that year. The church closed in August 1924 so that the organ could be refurbished and four stops added. The opportunity was also taken to provide better accommodation for the choir. Services were held in the schoolroom until the church was reopened on 27November 1924 with a service held in the afternoon. On 1September 1933, the Methodist circuits of Draycott, Cheddar, Congresbury and Palmer's Green, were united to form one circuit, under the name of the Cheddar Valley Methodist Circuit.

Design and features

Church

The church consists of a chancel, nave chancel, and two transepts, with a gallery at one end facing the pulpit. There is a staircase turret with pyramidal cap to the north east for access to the gallery. An organ is installed in the eastern transept. It cased with freestone, and has an arched pitch pine ceiling, divided into panels by moulded ribs, bearing on attached stone shafts. At the extreme end of the chancel, immediately above the communion table, there is memorial window by Clayton and Bell, representing Dorcas amidst the people that she helped, in her illness, in her death, and resurrection. Immediately beneath the memorial window, and extending the whole length of communion platform, there is brass plate with the following inscription:

In April 1894, Sidney Hill gifted four stained glass windows to the church. The windows were made by Joseph Bell and Sons, of College Green, Bristol, and represent:

 The presentation of our Lord in the temple
 Christ healing the sick
 His last charge to His Apostles
 Lord blessing little children

The first three subjects are installed in windows on one side of the building, and Lord blessing little children is installed in the transept. Each subject is arranged to occupy three panels formed by canopy work and casements. Lord blessing little children follows the same arrangement but angels are displayed in the stone work of the tracery. Each of the windows has a scriptural text at the foot of the lights.

Porch
The porch was built in Perpendicular Gothic style, with Rowberrow stone and Doulting freestone dressings. The side doors are made of teak, the roof of pitch pine, with encaustic floor tiles. The stained glass windows were made by James Bell and Son, College Green, Bristol, and represent:
 The Four Evangelists
 The Minor Prophets

On each sole of the church entrance is a pedestal brought from Bethlehem and Jerusalem, the gift of William Sidney Adams, of South Africa, that held lamps when the porch was first opened. A large number of Wesleyans from all parts of the Circuit attended the opening ceremony on 26 October 1898.

Schoolroom
From January 1902, further stained glass windows were installed in the schoolroom. The first window to be installed was Suffer little children to come unto me, displayed in three windows, and with the text displayed at the foot of the middle window. The windows were funded by Sidney Hill and designed by James Paxton Brown Young of Horfield, Bristol. Young was a former employee of Joseph Bell and Sons, and at that time, was the figure glass painting artist for the stained glass in the chapel. Young formulated designs for a number of other windows in the school:
 Christ blessing the children and Sermon on the Mount (three leaded lights each)
 Nativity, Adoration of the Magi, Subservient to His parents, and Christ with the Doctors in the Temple (two leaded lights each)
 Christ entering Jerusalem and Feeding of the Five Thousand (three windows each)
 Woman of Samaria, On the way to Emmaus, Good Shepherd, and Light of the World, are displayed in a single window

Ministers
The Reverend Meg Slingo is the incumbent minister covering Churchill. She was a former minister of Salem Methodist Church, Cheslyn Hay, Staffordshire, before being inducted to the Somerset Mendip Methodist circuit on the 30August 2019 in a ceremony at Wells Methodist church.

See also

Footnotes

References

Further reading

External links
  of the Churchill Methodist Church.
 History of the Methodist Church.
 The heritage of the Methodist Church in the United Kingdom.
  of the Somerset and Mendip Methodist circuit.

19th-century Methodist church buildings
19th-century churches in the United Kingdom
Charities based in Somerset
Churches completed in 1881
Churches in North Somerset
English Gothic architecture in Somerset
Grade II listed monuments and memorials
Grade II listed churches in Somerset
Grade II listed buildings in North Somerset
Methodist churches in Somerset
Monuments and memorials in Somerset